Miami International Mall is an enclosed shopping mall in Doral, Florida in southwestern Metropolitan Miami, only half a mile away from the larger Dolphin Mall. The Miami International Airport is nearby, thus giving the mall its name. It was built by the Edward J. DeBartolo Corp. in 1982, and is currently managed by Simon Property Group, who owns 47.8% of it. The mall has 4 anchor stores: J. C. Penney, Kohl's, and 2 Macy's locations (just like Coral Square). There are 130 shops and eateries as well. From 1982 until 2000, the mall had indoor trees, five fountains to throw pennies in (one in front of each of the anchors), a children's train, and a large cascading floor level fountain in center court. The large center fountain was shut off and sat unused through most of the 1990s. It was later completely removed and the circular space was used for cart vendors. Being near Florida International University, it is a popular hang-out place for students.

History
Built in 1982 and similar to Broward Mall four years earlier and Town Center at Boca Raton two years afterwards, the mall's original anchors were Burdines, Jordan Marsh, and Sears (the latter opened in July 1983 followed by Aventura Mall the next month). Lord & Taylor was added in 1985 (likewise done at Boynton Beach Mall).

Mervyn's, which replaced Lord & Taylor in 1991, was sold to Dillard's in 1997. Jordan Marsh was also husbanded and refashioned as a Burdines men's, home, and furniture location. J. C. Penney built a store in 1992 (as with Pembroke Lakes Mall).

In 2000, Miami International Mall underwent an extensive renovation and celebrated its "Grand re-opening" in 2001 when the nearby Dolphin Mall opened with an international theme. Just like the Boynton Beach Mall, the renovation included removing its old features (the trees, fountains, etc.), and making it a more modern looking mall. Burdines also added a second floor to their original store, now used for their women’s and children’s departments. Both Burdines stores became Macy's in 2005 as part of a nationwide transaction, and the Lord & Taylor/Mervyn’s/Dillard's building became Kohl’s, September 28, 2011 (just like at Coral Square). 

In 2015, Sears Holdings spun off 235 of its properties, including the Sears at Miami International Mall, into Seritage Growth Properties. On August 23, 2018, it was announced that Sears would be closing as part of a plan to close 46 stores nationwide, making it the last original anchor to close. The store closed in November 2018.

References

External links
Miami International Mall

Shopping malls in Miami-Dade County, Florida
Simon Property Group
Shopping malls established in 1982